Stereotype Be is the solo debut album of Kevin Max. The album blends progressive rock, world music (particularly Middle Eastern), spoken word, and traditional pop, with spiritual lyrics.

Track listing

Demo Sessions track listing 

 "My Sweet Lord" (George Harrison) – 4:32
 "Shaping Space" – 4:05
 "Deconstructing Venus" – 5:01
 "Dead End Moon" – 5:23
 "End of the Beginning" – 6:06
 "Angel Without Wings" – 4:29
 "Mojo Reckoning" – 5:05
 "The Revolution" – 3:52
 "Burn Me Up" – 4:43
 "Leaving the Planet" – 4:10
 "Dark Night" – 4:22
 "You" - 4:24

The working title of the album was given as London Cowboy in February 2001 before its eventual renaming.

"End of the Beginning" was revamped by Max and used as the second track of his 2012 EP, Fiefdom of Angels-Side One.

In 2015 Kevin released Stereotype Be-Sides which included these tracks and others not before heard.

Personnel 
 Kevin Max – vocals, tambourine, backing vocals (1, 9), keyboards (4, 5, 12, 14.1), acoustic piano (10)
 Mark Lee Townsend – programming (1, 2, 6)
 Jamie Kenney – programming (11)
 George Cocchini – guitars (1, 2)
 J.R. McNeely – acoustic guitar (2)
 Adrian Belew – sitar (2), guitars (3, 8, 10, 13, 14.1), pedal steel guitar (3), string arrangements (6, 8, 10, 12), koto (10), electric guitars (12), Roland V-drums (12), vibraphone (12)
 Will Owsley – guitars (3, 4, 5, 9), acoustic guitar (4, 5, 11), backing vocals (9)
 Erick Cole – acoustic guitar (4, 5, 11), guitars (10, 14.1), additional guitars (13)
 John Mark Painter – guitars (6), theremin (6), baglama (6), string arrangements (6, 8, 10, 12), flugelhorn (10, 11), electric guitar (11), slide guitar (11), bass (11)
 Tony Levin – bass (1-6, 8, 9, 10, 12, 13, 14.1), Chapman Stick (6)
 Matt Chamberlain – drums (1-6, 8, 9, 10, 12, 13, 14.1), percussion 
 Scott Lenox – loops (8)
 Lee Thornburg – trumpet, flugelhorn, French horn
 Larry Norman – Jew's harp (11), backing vocals (11)
 Alisa Gyse – backing vocals (1)
 Stacy "Coffee" Jones – bridge rap (2)

Handclaps on "Blind"
 Adrian Belew, Matt Chamberlain, Erick Cole, Graham Elvis, Tony Levin and Kevin Max

Production 
 Adrian Belew – producer 
 Kevin Max – producer, art direction 
 David Bach – A&R 
 Kevin Latchney – engineer 
 J.R. McNeely – engineer, mixing 
 Ted Jensen – mastering at Sterling Sound (New York City, New York)
 Susannah Parrish – creative coordinator 
 Scott McDaniel – art direction
 Neal Ashby – design 
 Danny Clinch – photography 
 CL Entertainment, Inc. – management

References

Kevin Max albums
2001 albums
ForeFront Records albums
Albums produced by Adrian Belew